Jean Morrison is a South African alternative rock singer-songwriter and musician. He released an EP in 2008 (F.A.W.E.) which was produced by Video Killed The Radio Star guitarist and Squeal frontman, David Birch. His music has been compared to Radiohead, Jeff Buckley and Muse and he has supported South African acts such as Stealing Love Jones, Josie Field, Farryl Purkiss and Squeal. He toured South Africa nationally with Steve Murray from Stealing Love Jones.

Early life 
Jean Morrison was born in Durban, South Africa. While performing at a local open-mic night, Morrison was spotted by South African singer-songwriter, Farryl Purkiss, who invited Jean to open for him.

Career
On 19 August 2008, Morrison released his debut EP, F.A.W.E., at the Dockyard Theatre in Durban. The EP was recorded at Tropical Sweat Studios with David Birch. Morrison described the genre on the EP as "neo-acoustic romanticised ballroom rock". Well received by critics, South African national newspaper, The Citizen, described Morrison as a "considerable writing talent" and F.A.W.E. as having "Convincing Clarity". "Now & Then" was the first single from the EP and was added to rotation on East Coast Radio. In 2008, Morrison performed at the annual White Mountain Festival.

"Cardboard Skies" was released as a single in 2015. The music video aired on the cable network AXS TV. It debuted at No. 18 on the ITunes New Rock releases Chart for the USA. "Cardboard Skies" was one of the finalists in the Rock/Alternative category of the 20th Annual USA Songwriting Competition in 2015.

References

External links
Official Website

1984 births
Living people
South African male  singer-songwriters
South African guitarists
Male guitarists
South African rock musicians
People from Durban
Musicians from Durban
21st-century guitarists
21st-century South African male singers